James R. Garven is an American finance scholar and also the Frank Shelby Groner Memorial Professor Chair of Finance at Baylor University, and also a published author of nearly 10 books, being held in 58 libraries.

References

Year of birth missing (living people)
Living people
American finance and investment writers
Baylor University faculty